Dorothy Nelson may refer to:

Dorothy Wright Nelson, American judge
Dorothy Nelson (Irish author); winner of Rooney Prize for Irish Literature (1983)